The Fisheries and Marine Institute of Memorial University of Newfoundland, popularly referred to as the Marine Institute (MI) or simply Marine, is a post-secondary ocean and marine polytechnic located in St. John's, Newfoundland and Labrador, Canada. It is affiliated with Memorial University of Newfoundland.

The Marine Institute is considered the most comprehensive institution of its kind in North America, with unique facilities such as two full ships bridge simulators and the world's largest flume tank. It offers degrees, diplomas, certifications and industry training for the maritime sector.

History
In 1964, Newfoundland Premier Joey Smallwood opened the College of Fisheries, Navigation, Marine Engineering and Electronics, at the former Parade St. campus of Memorial University College (now Memorial University of Newfoundland). The Fisheries College, as it was then known colloquially, was moved in 1985 to its current Ridge Road building and renamed to the Institute of Fisheries and Marine Technology.

1992 saw the name change again, as the institution became affiliated with Memorial University as The Fisheries and Marine Institute of Memorial University of Newfoundland.

Campus
Marine's main campus is located on Ridge Road, overlooking the city of St. John's.

Academia
Marine is academically organized into three primary structures: the School of Fisheries, the School of Maritime Studies, and the School of Ocean Technology

School of Fisheries
The School of Fisheries focuses on the use, sustainability and management of aquatic resources and the marine environment; primarily, aquaculture, harvesting, food processing and safety. It encompasses the Centre for Sustainable Aquatic Resources (CSAR) and the Centre for Aquaculture and Seafood Development (CASD).

School of Maritime Studies
The School of Maritime Studies focuses on the marine transport industry and its related fields; primarily, ship operations and vessel design. It encompasses the Offshore Safety and Survival Centre (OSSC) and the Centre for Marine Simulation (CMS).

School of Ocean Technology
The School of Ocean Technology was established in May 2007 with a $1 million investment from the government of Newfoundland and Labrador. The school focuses on technologies that enable safe, efficient, and effective activity in ocean industries. This includes ocean instrumentation and equipment, marine information and communication technologies, ocean mapping and underwater technology. The school will also provide education and training as well as industrial outreach for the Ocean Technology sector.

Student life

Atmosphere
Marine is a small school, with small class sizes and close instructor-student interaction. The Canadian Forces had a naval training detachment within the school up until 2015, so at one point it was common to see students in military uniform.

MISU
MISU is the Marine Institute Student Union, a Canadian Federation of Students associated student organization. Some of the provided services include extended health and dental insurance, tutor arrangements, and club ratifications.

Marine Socials
Every Friday evening, MISU hosts a well-attended social function in the Mariner's Lounge; with relatively affordable beverages and live entertainment.

See also
 Memorial University of Newfoundland
 Webb Institute
 Higher education in Newfoundland and Labrador
 Canadian university scientific research organizations

References

External links
 

Universities and colleges in Newfoundland and Labrador
Memorial University of Newfoundland
Maritime colleges in Canada